Drilolestes retowskii is a species of predatory air-breathing land slug. It is a shell-less pulmonate gastropod mollusc in the family Trigonochlamydidae.

Drilolestes retowskii is the only species in the genus Drilolestes.

The generic name Drilolestes contains the suffix -lestes, that means "robber".

Distribution 
The distribution of Drilolestes retowskii includes northern Turkey (Vilayet Zonguldak) and Georgia in the Caucasus region, specifically on the Psyrtzkha River in Abkhazia, near the New Athos Cave.

Description 
The size of preserved specimens is 12–18 mm. Live individuals are larger.

Ecology 
Drilolestes retowskii inhabits forests and alpine zone.

References

Trigonochlamydidae
Taxa named by Oskar Boettger
Gastropods described in 1884